Right to farm laws in the United States deny nuisance lawsuits against farmers who use accepted and standard farming practices and have been in prior operation even if these practices harm or bother adjacent property owners or the general public. Agricultural nuisances may include noise, odors, visual clutter and dangerous structures. All 50 states have some form of Right to Farm law.

Many of these laws were passed after 1980 because of the reduction of available farmland, adversity from private and public nuisance actions, which hinder the prospect of farming. The laws are aimed to minimize the threat to normal farming practices from nuisance litigation and prohibitive state and local government regulation. In contrast to typical farmland preservation policies, which aim to preserve farmland itself, Right to Farm laws attempt to preserve the agricultural practices and enhance farm viability.

Local laws represent support for farming practices by a community and are often so more refined and clearer than state laws; they typically define the extent of protection farmers actually receive from nuisance suits and inappropriate regulation.

Protection for farmers 

Right to farm laws vary across the nation. They are intended to bolster the legitimacy of agricultural concerns, defend farmers rights without undue outside interference, and minimize or resolve public and private land use conflicts. In a broader sense the notion originally referred to relief from all kinds of undue interference, usually involving legal interpretations focused on nuisance issues such as noise, odors, environmental, visual, farm technology, etc. This is partly because it is a modification of the common law doctrine of nuisance. Common law nuisances are seen as private or public nuisances. A public nuisance impairs the health, safety, morals, and comfort of the general community without necessarily harming particular property rights in any kind way. A private nuisance unreasonably interferes with the use and enjoyment of another's land.

For a nuisance that the law will provide a remedy, there must he a substantial and unreasonable interference with the property interest being asserted. The interference can be negligent or intentional. For instance in the duties of farm operations, an action constituting a nuisance will be deemed intentional even if it is unintended if it is an easily likely consequence of the farmer's otherwise protected farming activities. The drifting of sprayed farm pesticides onto a neighbor's land is considered an intentional nuisance even though this particular result is unintended.

Right-to-farm policies vary at different policy levels, resulting in inconsistent interpretations regarding what constitutes an 'agrarian district' or 'proper' agrarian practice. Government officials may intervene and enact such laws for resource preservation or municipal management purposes, but states and their respective localities are usually left to their own devices. In New York, the NYSDAM (New York State Department of Agriculture & Markets) evaluates nuisance lawsuits on a case-by-case basis. As per §308 of New York's Right-To-Farm Statute, farm owners and operators are protected from private nuisance suits "provided such agricultural practice constitutes a sound agricultural practice pursuant to an opinion issued upon request by the commissioner". Further, New York's policy does not protect against damages for personal injury or wrongful death claims, nor does it apply to public nuisances. Note that this policy definition may influence stakeholders to obtain farmland in states where their interests are protected by that state's respective right-to-farm law.

History 
The laws were developed in the 1970s as a response to suburban encroachment on agricultural land. The concern was that as farmland was converted to suburban developments, the new residents would bring lawsuits against the pre-existing farms complaining about agricultural noise, dust, and other nuisances. The legal costs to defend themselves would tend to push farmers out of business, and the trend toward urbanization would accelerate. The laws were created as a way to protect small farmers from these lawsuits and thereby preserve the open space that made the communities attractive in the first place. Massachusetts passed the first right to farm law in 1979.

In 1979, Pilesgrove Township, New Jersey enacted the state's first right-to-farm ordinance, protecting farming as a "natural right hereby ordained to exist as a permitted use everywhere in the Township of Pilesgrove."

By 2015, every state has a similar law, but the details can vary.

Debate 
The utilization of right to farm policies for corporate agriculture can be considered a 'wicked problem'. These problems are shaped by "dynamic social and political factors as well as biophysical complexities", and an array of local, state, and government stakeholders. These diverse actors result in a high degree of variability in terms of defining what is protected under respective right to farm laws.  Thus, the initial intention of such policies was to preserve the nation's agrarian roots and support the small-scale farmer, potential for misappropriation exists. In 2014, the American Legislative Exchange Council financially backed Missouri's Right-to-Farm amendment (Amendment 1), fueling further controversy that Right-to-Farm laws are being enacted to assist corporate agriculture, not small family-owned farms and the traditional farming practices used by small farm owners. In November 2016, Oklahoma voters defeated a Right-to-Farm bill (State Question 777) which garnered just 39.7 percent of the vote. State Question 777 was heavily backed by the Oklahoma Farm Bureau and by voters in the Oklahoma panhandle where the giant multinational agribusiness Seaboard Corporation has a pork production plant.

See also 

 Agricultural zoning
 NIMBY

References

Further reading 
 Property Observer covers the Right to farm law legislated by the NSW government.

External links 
 States’ Right-To-Farm Statutes - National Agricultural Law Center

Agricultural law
Agriculture in the United States
Food sovereignty
State law in the United States
Urban planning in the United States
Zoning in the United States
United States state environmental legislation